Aulandra beccarii is a plant in the family Sapotaceae. It grows as a small tree. The twigs are reddish brown. Flowers are pale yellow. A. beccarii is endemic to Borneo.

Aulandra beccarii grows on steep hill slopes in sandy soil in lowland mixed dipterocarp forest at about 300 meters elevation.

References

beccarii
Endemic flora of Borneo
Trees of Borneo
Plants described in 1909
Flora of the Borneo lowland rain forests